Colin Bell (born 5 August 1961) is an English football manager and former player who coaches the South Korea women's national team.

Playing career
Bell began his career at Leicester City, but did not break into the first team and left for Germany aged 20. Bell played for VfL Hamm and 1. FSV Mainz 05, featuring in the 2. Bundesliga for the latter.

Coaching career
Bell retired to take up coaching in 1989. He managed TuS Koblenz for seven years, before joining the coaching staff of 1. FC Köln in 1996. In 1999, he took on his most high-profile role to date, managing Dynamo Dresden, but was not successful – the team failed to qualify for the restructured Regionalliga, and dropped to the Oberliga (level four) for the first time. He was sacked before the end of the season. After spells managing SV Waldhof Mannheim, 1. FSV Mainz 05's reserve team, and SC Preußen Münster, he worked at TuS Koblenz as assistant manager and youth coach.

In 2011, he signed for SC 07 Bad Neuenahr in Germany's Women's Bundesliga. Two seasons later, Bell became the manager of 1. FFC Frankfurt. The team won the Frauen DFB Pokal in 2014 and the UEFA Women's Champions League in 2015.

In December 2015, he left 1. FFC Frankfurt to coach Avaldsnes IL.

In July 2016, he returned to Germany to coach Sand.

On 8 February 2017, Colin Bell was appointed the Senior International Manager of the Republic of Ireland, replacing Sue Ronan. He took up his new position from 13 February 2017.

On 29 June 2019, he was appointed as the Assistant Head Coach at EFL Championship club Huddersfield Town.

On 18 October 2019, he was appointed as the manager of the South Korea women's national team, with a contract to run up to and including the 2022 Women's Asian Cup. He became the first ever manager to guide South Korea to the final of a Women's Asian Cup, guiding South Korea to the final of the 2022 edition, where South Korea finished runners-up after losing to China.

Honours 
1. FFC Frankfurt 

 UEFA Women's Champions League: 2014–15

References

External links
 Colin Bell at fsv05.de 
 

1961 births
Living people
Footballers from Leicester
English footballers
English expatriate footballers
English football managers
English expatriate football managers
Leicester City F.C. players
1. FSV Mainz 05 players
English expatriate sportspeople in Germany
Expatriate footballers in Germany
Dynamo Dresden managers
2. Bundesliga players
SC Preußen Münster managers
English expatriate sportspeople in Norway
Expatriate football managers in Norway
Republic of Ireland women's national football team managers
South Korea women's national football team managers
TuS Koblenz managers
1. FSV Mainz 05 II managers
Association football defenders

Huddersfield Town A.F.C. non-playing staff